The 1974–75 FA Cup was the 94th season of the world's oldest football cup competition, the Football Association Challenge Cup, commonly known as the FA Cup. West Ham United won the competition, beating Second Division side Fulham 2–0 in the final at Wembley, London.

Matches were scheduled to be played at the stadium of the team named first on the date specified for each round, which was always a Saturday. If scores were level after 90 minutes had been played, a replay would take place at the stadium of the second-named team later the same week. If the replayed match was drawn further replays would be held until a winner was determined. If scores were level after 90 minutes had been played in a replay, a 30-minute period of extra time would be played.

Calendar

Results

First round proper

At this stage clubs from the Football League Third and Fourth Division joined 28 non-league clubs having come through the qualifying rounds. To complete this round, Morecambe, Dartford, Bishop's Stortford and  Ilford were given byes as finalists of FA Trophy and FA Amateur Cup the last season. Matches were scheduled to be played on Saturday, 23 November 1974. Twelve matches were drawn, of which one required a second replay.

Second round proper 
The matches were scheduled for Saturday, 14 December 1974. Five matches were drawn, with replays taking place later the same week.

Third round proper
The 44 First and Second Division clubs entered the competition at this stage. The matches were scheduled Saturday, 4 January 1975. Eleven matches were drawn, of which two required second replays.

Fourth round proper
The matches were scheduled for Saturday, 25 January 1975. Four matches were drawn, of which one, the tie between Fulham and Nottingham Forest, required three replays. Holders Liverpool were eliminated by Ipswich Town.

Fifth round proper
The matches were scheduled for Saturday, 15 February 1975. Two matches were drawn, of which one required a second replay.

Sixth round proper

Replay

Second replay

Third replay

Semi-finals

Replays

Final

The final took place on Saturday, 3 May 1975 at Wembley and ended in a victory for West Ham United over Fulham by 2–0. Both goals were scored by Alan Taylor. The attendance was 100,000.

TV coverage

The right to show FA Cup games were, as with Football League matches, shared between the BBC and ITV network. All games were shown in a highlights format, except the Final, which was shown live both on BBC1 & ITV. The BBC football highlights programme Match Of The Day would show up to three games and the various ITV regional network stations would cover up to one game and show highlights from other games covered elsewhere on the ITV network. No games from rounds 1 or 2 were shown. Highlights of replays would be shown on either the BBC or ITV.
Third round BBC Orient v Derby County, Liverpool v Stoke City, Southampton v West Ham United ITV Wycombe Wanderers v Middlesbrough (LWT), Manchester City v Newcastle United (Granada & Tyne-Tees), Wolverhampton Wanderers v Ipswich Town (ATV), Southend United v Queens Park Rangers (Anglia), Leeds United v Cardiff City (Yorkshire), Brighton & Hove Albion v Leatherhead (Southern), Derby County v Orient (Midweek replay All Regions). Fourth round BBC Leatherhead v Leicester City, Plymouth Argyle v Everton, Middlesbrough v Sunderland, Arsenal v Coventry (Midweek replay), Wimbledon v Leeds United (Monday night replay) ITV Ipswich Town v Liverpool (Anglia & Granada), West Ham United v  Swindon Town (LWT & HTV), Coventry City v Arsenal (ATV), Leeds United v Wimbledon (Yorkshire). Fifth round BBC Peterborough United v Middlesbrough, Arsenal v Leicester City, Mansfield Town v Carlisle United ITV West Ham United v Queens Park Rangers (LWT), Everton v Fulham (Granada),Ipswich Town v Aston Villa (Anglia), Birmingham City v Walsall (ATV), Derby County v Leeds United (Midweek All regions), Leicester City v Arsenal (Midweek 2nd replay All regions), Sixth round BBC Arsenal v West Ham United, Birmingham City v Middlesbrough ITV Carlisle United v Fulham (Granada, LWT & Tyne-Tees), Ipswich Town v Leeds United (Anglia & Yorkshire), Leeds United v Ipswich Town (Midweek 2nd replay All regions) Semi-Finals BBC Ipswich Town v West Ham United ITV Birmingham City v Fulham (All regions). Note neither BBC or ITV covered the replays, the goals were only shown as clips for TV news reports, with commentary over dubbed later. Final Fulham v West Ham United Shown live on both BBC & ITV

Notes
A. : Match played at Victoria Ground, Stoke-on-Trent.
B. : Match played at Filbert Street, Leicester.
C. : Match played at Selhurst Park, London.
D. : Match played at The Hawthorns, West Bromwich.
E. : Match played at Old Trafford, Manchester.
F. : Match played at Elland Road, Leeds.
G. : Match played at London Road, Peterborough.

References
General
The FA Cup Archive at TheFA.com
English FA Cup 1974/75 at Soccerbase
F.A. Cup results 1974/75 at Footballsite
Specific

 
FA Cup seasons
Fa
Eng